Imbricatea is a class of Rhizaria characterised by silica scales. It is sometimes described as "Imbricatea/Silicofilosea", due to the similarity of those two groupings. Imbricatea is divided into the orders Euglyphida and Thaumatomonadida.

Phylogeny
Phylogeny based on Cavalier-Smith & Chao 2012

References

 
Cercozoa classes